New Again is an album and associated title track by Taking Back Sunday. The phrase may also refer to:
"New Again" (Kanye West song), a song by Kanye West from the album Donda
"New Again", a song by Myka Relocate from the album The Young Souls
"New Again", a song by Sara West from the album I'll Be Home for Christmas